The 2015 North Hertfordshire Council election was held on 7 May 2015, at the same time as other local elections and the general election. Of the 49 seats on North Hertfordshire District Council, 16 were up for election.

The Conservatives increased their majority on the council. They gained two seats, one from Labour and one from the Liberal Democrats. The Conservative leader, Lynda Needham, continued to serve as leader of the council. Shortly after the election, Labour changed its leader from Judi Billing to Frank Radcliffe.

Overall results
The overall results were as follows:

Ward results
The results for each ward were as follows. Where the previous incumbent was standing for re-election they are marked with an asterisk(*).

References

2015 English local elections
May 2015 events in the United Kingdom
2015
2010s in Hertfordshire